Barry Posner may refer to:

 Barry Posner (physician) (born 1937), Canadian physician and research scientist
 Barry Posner (academic) (born 1949), American leadership academic

Posner, Barry Lionel (born 1965), Healthcare Consultant